Dinwiddie County is a county located in the Commonwealth of Virginia. As of the 2020 census, the population was 27,947. Its county seat is Dinwiddie.

Dinwiddie County is part of the Richmond, VA Metropolitan Statistical Area.

Famous people include: Neal Chappell, Dakota Erb, Cody Long, Aaron Long, Isiah Embry, Jordan Embry

History

The first inhabitants of the area were Paleo-Indians, prior to 8000 BC. They are believed to have been nomadic hunter-gatherers following animal migrations. Early stone tools have been discovered in various fields within the county. At the time of European contact, Native Americans made their homes in the region.

Dinwiddie County was formed May 1, 1752, from Prince George County. The county is named for Robert Dinwiddie, Lieutenant Governor of Virginia, 1751–58. The county raised several militia units that would fight in the American Revolution.

Dinwiddie County was the birthplace of Elizabeth (Burwell) Hobbs Keckly, a free black dressmaker who worked for two presidents' wives: Mrs. Jefferson Davis and later Mary Todd Lincoln. Thomas Day was also a native; he was well known later at Milton, North Carolina, as a free black cabinetmaker. Another native son was Dr. Thomas Stewart, perhaps America's first free black 18th-century rural physician.

During the Civil War the Battle of Lewis's Farm was fought along Quaker Road [Rt. 660]. It took place on March 29, 1865. This was the first in several attempts by Union General Ulysses S. Grant to cut Robert E. Lee's final supply line—the Southside Railroad—in the spring of 1865. Here the Union forces led by Brig. Gen. Joshua L. Chamberlain engaged Confederates under Maj. Gen. Bushrod R. Johnson. After sharp fighting, the Union troops entrenched nearby along the Boydton Plank Road, and Johnson withdrew to his lines at White Oak Road. The Union army cut the rail line four days later, after capturing Five Forks on April 1, 1865, at the Battle of Five Forks. Several other engagements were fought in Dinwiddie County, including the Battle of Dinwiddie Court House, Battle of Sutherland's Station, and Battle of White Oak Road.

The Dinwiddie County Historical Society currently occupies the historic Dinwiddie County Court House.

Civil War battles
 Battle of Peebles' Farm
 Battle of Lewis's Farm
 Battle of Dinwiddie Court House
 Battle of White Oak Road
 Battle of Five Forks
 Battle of Sutherland's Station

Geography
Dinwiddie is located in southern Virginia, southwest of the independent city of Petersburg, which separated from the county (and adjacent Prince George County) in 1871. It is located between two US Army forts, Fort Lee to the east and Fort Pickett to the west.

Adjacent counties
 Chesterfield County – north
 Petersburg City – northeast
 Prince George County – east
 Sussex County – southeast
 Greensville County – south
 Brunswick County – southwest
 Nottoway County – west
 Amelia County – northwest

National protected area
 Petersburg National Battlefield (part)

Major highways

Demographics

2020 census

Note: the US Census treats Hispanic/Latino as an ethnic category. This table excludes Latinos from the racial categories and assigns them to a separate category. Hispanics/Latinos can be of any race.

2000 Census
As of the census of 2000, there were 24,533 people, 9,107 households, and 6,720 families residing in the county.  The population density was 49 people per square mile (19/km2).  There were 9,707 housing units at an average density of 19 per square mile (7/km2).  The racial makeup of the county was 64.55% White, 33.66% Black or African American, 0.22% Native American, 0.31% Asian, 0.04% Pacific Islander, 0.40% from other races, and 0.82% from two or more races.  0.97% of the population were Hispanic or Latino of any race.

There were 9,107 households, out of which 32.10% had children under the age of 18 living with them, 54.80% were married couples living together, 13.90% had a female householder with no husband present, and 26.20% were non-families. 22.20% of all households were made up of individuals, and 8.50% had someone living alone who was 65 years of age or older.  The average household size was 2.58 and the average family size was 3.01.

In the county, the population was spread out, with 24.00% under the age of 18, 6.70% from 18 to 24, 30.90% from 25 to 44, 26.20% from 45 to 64, and 12.20% who were 65 years of age or older.  The median age was 38 years. For every 100 females, there were 98.80 males.  For every 100 females age 18 and over, there were 96.00 males.

The median income for a household in the county was $41,582, and the median income for a family was $47,961. Males had a median income of $32,860 versus $24,346 for females. The per capita income for the county was $19,122.  About 6.60% of families and 9.30% of the population were below the poverty line, including 11.60% of those under age 18 and 12.60% of those age 65 or over.

Government

Board of Supervisors
 District 1: Harrison A. Moody (D)
 District 2: Mark E. Moore (I)
 District 3: William D. Chavis (I)
 District 4: Daniel D. Lee (I)
 District 5: Brenda K. Ebron-Bonner (D)

Constitutional officers
 Clerk of the Circuit Court: John Barrett Chappell, Jr. (D)
 Commissioner of the Revenue: Lori K. Stevens (R)
 Commonwealth's Attorney: Ann Cabell Baskervill (I)
 Sheriff: D.T. "Duck" Adams (D)
 Treasurer: Jennifer Caraway Perkins (D)

Dinwiddie is represented by Republican Frank Ruff and Democrat Joe Morrissey in the Virginia Senate, Democrats Lashrecse Aird and Roslyn Tyler in the Virginia House of Delegates, and Democrat A. Donald McEachin in the U.S. House of Representatives.

Communities
The Bureau of Economic Analysis combines the independent cities of Petersburg and Colonial Heights with Dinwiddie County for statistical purposes.

Town
 McKenney

Census-designated places
 Dinwiddie (county seat)

Unincorporated communities
 Ammon
 Carson
 Church Road
 DeWitt
 Darvils
 Ford
 Sutherland
 Wilsons

Education
Appomattox Regional Library serves as the public library for the area.

References

External links

 Dinwiddie County official website

 
Virginia counties
1752 establishments in Virginia
Greater Richmond Region